John Cartwright (born 1957) is the  Professor of the Law of Contract at the University of Oxford, a Student (Fellow) of Christ Church, and a qualified Solicitor.   He sat Honour Moderations in Classics in 1978, but decided to become a lawyer and transferred courses, gaining a BA in Jurisprudence from the University in 1981. Afterwards, he read the BCL.

Cartwright was appointed an Official Student of Christ Church after graduation and has been a Tutor of Law since 1982. In 2004 he was appointed Reader in the Law of Contract at the University. He has been Professor of the Law of Contract since 2008. 

Further, he has been Professor of Anglo-American Private Law at the University of Leiden since 2007 and is a visiting professor to the Panthéon-Assas University ('Panthéon-Assas'). He speaks French fluently and has a profound interest in French law and in the promotion of the ties between the Universities of Oxford and Paris. Cartwright flies to Europe about once a week.

Publishing
Cartwright has written extensively on English contract law, comparative law and land law; his other areas of interest and research include Roman law and tort law.
His publications include:
Contract Law: An Introduction to the English Law of Contract for the Civil Lawyer : Hart Publishing, 2007
Misrepresentation, Mistake and Non-Disclosure (2nd expanded edition of Misrepresentation) : Sweet & Maxwell (Contract Law Library), 2006
Cheshire & Burn's Modern Law of Real Property : 17th edn (jointly with E.H. Burn), Oxford University Press, 2006
Misrepresentation : Sweet & Maxwell (Contract Law Library), 2002
 Anson's Law of Contract: 29th edn (jointly with Jack Beatson and Andrew Burrows): Oxford University Press, 2010

References

1957 births
Living people
Alumni of Christ Church, Oxford
Fellows of Christ Church, Oxford
British legal scholars
British solicitors
Legal scholars of the University of Oxford